Nicolas Walsh (born 23 December 1990) is a Scottish football referee, currently a referee in the SPFL and a FIFA referee.

Refereeing career
Walsh's first Scottish Professional Football League game as a referee came at the beginning of the Scottish League Two campaign, when he oversaw Clyde against Queen's Park.

On 22 October 2022, Walsh refereed the second Scottish Premiership match with the video assistant referee (VAR), which saw Celtic beat Hearts 4–3.

References

External links
Nick Walsh Referee Statistics Soccerbase

Living people
Scottish football referees
1990 births
Scottish Professional Football League referees